2010 Indonesian Futsal League (IFL) is the 4th edition of Indonesian Futsal League, which is organized by the PSSI (Indonesian football association). The competition will be held in 3 consecutive series (full competition) in 3 cities (Jakarta, Riau and Surabaya).

The winner of this competition will represent Indonesia in the AFC Futsal Club Championship.

Participating clubs
Eight clubs are participating in this competition:

Electric PLN (Jakarta)
Pelindo II (Jakarta)
Limus IBM Jaya (West Java)
Futsal Kota Bandung (West Java)
Jatim Futsal (Surabaya)
Bank Sumut FC (North Sumatra)
Harimau Rawa (Riau)
Isen Mulang (Central Kalimantan)

Competition system

Regular stages
First series, starts on 2–8 August 2010 in Jakarta
Second series, starts on 30 September - 3 October 2010 in Riau
Third series, starts on 14–17 October in Surabaya

Final four
The best four clubs in regular stage will qualify to the final four stage which will be held in Jakarta, 1–3 November 2010.

Final four

Semifinal

Third Placed

Final

Individual Award

Top Scorers

Best Players

References

Futsal in Indonesia
Indonesian Futsal League, 2010